Candín is a village and municipality located in the region of El Bierzo (province of León, Castile and León, Spain) . According to the 2010 census (INE), the municipality has a population of 310 inhabitants.

It is one of Galician speaking councils of Castilla y León

Towns
 Balouta
 Espinareda de Ancares
 Lumeras
 Pereda de Ancares
 Sorbeira
 Suarbol
 Suertes
 Tejedo de Ancares
 Villarbón
 Villasumil

References

Municipalities in El Bierzo